Hitler Youth: Growing up in Hitler's Shadow is a non-fiction children's book written by Susan Campbell Bartoletti, and published in 2005. It received the Newbery Honor medal in 2006.

The book is a study of the Hitler Youth, a paramilitary organization of children and young people dedicated to furthering the aims of the Third Reich, and was organized around interviews with 12 former members and their experiences in the organization.

One episode of the book is fleshed out into her novel The Boy Who Dared, about Helmuth Hübener, the youngest person to be sentenced to death by the Nazis during World War II.

Reception
Hitler Youth received starred reviews from Publishers Weekly and Booklist. The book also received the following accolades:

 Newbery Medal Nominee (2006)
 Sibert Medal Nominee (2006)
 NCTE Orbis Pictus Honor Book (2006)
 Notable Children's Books (2006)
 American Library Association Best Books for Young Adults (2006)
 Booklist's Top of the List (2005)
 Booklist Editors' Choice: Books for Youth (2005)

References

See also 

Newbery Honor-winning works
Hitler Youth
2005 children's books
Children's history books
American children's books
History books about Nazi Germany